Stefan Todorović (born 1997) is a Serbian football defender who plays for FK Napredak Kruševac.

Honours
Napredak Kruševac
Serbian First League: 2015–16

References

External links
 

1997 births
Living people
Association football defenders
Serbian footballers
FK Napredak Kruševac players
FK Temnić players
FK Tutin players
FK Trayal Kruševac players
Serbian First League players